Andromeda (formally titled Gene Roddenberry's Andromeda) is a space opera television series, based on unused material by Gene Roddenberry, developed by Robert Hewitt Wolfe, and produced by Roddenberry's widow, Majel Barrett. It starred Kevin Sorbo as High Guard Captain Dylan Hunt. The series premiered on October 2, 2000, and ended on May 13, 2005.

Andromeda was filmed in Vancouver, British Columbia, Canada and produced by Andromeda Productions, Tribune Entertainment, Fireworks Entertainment and MBR Productions. In Canada, the show aired on Global Television Network (Fireworks' parent company) and ran in first-run broadcast syndication in the United States.

Andromeda is one of two television series (alongside Earth: Final Conflict) produced after Roddenberry's death based on concepts he had created as early as the 1960s and 1970s; Roddenberry died in 1991, nine years prior to the series premiere. The name Dylan Hunt had previously been used for the hero of two television pilots Roddenberry had produced in the mid-1970s – Genesis II and Planet Earth – all of which shared a similar dystopian post-apocalyptic premise.

Premise

Thousands of years in the future, the Systems Commonwealth is a constitutional monarchy based in a distant star system called Tarn-Vedra. Mankind is a part of the Commonwealth. It spans the Milky Way, Triangulum, and Andromeda, with Tarn-Vedra near its core. The Commonwealth is at war with the Magog, a predatory humanoid species with bat-like faces that is dedicated to war. Peace talks led the Commonwealth to cede a key world to the Magog, that of the Nietzscheans; in response, the Nietzscheans secretly attempted to usurp control of the Commonwealth. Dylan Hunt is the captain of the Commonwealth starship Andromeda Ascendant. Its computer is a powerful artificial intelligence which can emit a holographic interface persona in the form of a woman, called "Andromeda" or "Rommie". Caught by surprise in the first engagement of the Nietzschean uprising, the crew evacuates. The Andromeda, with Hunt aboard, is caught at the edge of the event horizon of a black hole, freezing both in time.

303 years later, in CY 10087 (approx 5167 AD), the crew of the salvage ship Eureka Maru locates the ship. The Systems Commonwealth has fallen, and the era known as The Long Night has begun. Hunt recruits the salvage crew to join him in an attempt to restore the Systems Commonwealth and "rekindle the light of civilization". The salvage crew comprises its leader, Beka Valentine, a con-artist and expert pilot; a super-genius engineer named Seamus Zelazny Harper (rescued from Nietzschean-enslaved Earth by Beka) who can plug his mind directly into computer systems; Trance Gemini, a mysterious alien of unknown origin whose innocent demeanor hides a surprisingly old soul, and Rev Bem, a Magog who has adopted a non-violent Taoist-like religion called The Way ("Rev" being short for "Reverend"). The salvage crew's beneficiary brings along an insurance policy in the form of a Nietzschean mercenary named Tyr Anasazi.

Characters

 Dylan Hunt – played by Kevin Sorbo, captain of the Andromeda Ascendant.
 Rebecca "Beka" Valentine – played by Lisa Ryder, captain of the Eureka Maru and first officer on Andromeda.
 Tyr Anasazi – played by Keith Hamilton Cobb, weapons officer (seasons 1–3; guest season 4).
 Seamus Zelazny Harper – played by Gordon Michael Woolvett, chief engineer.
 Trance Gemini – played by Laura Bertram, doctor and life support officer.
 Rev Bem (Reverend "Red Plague" Behemial Far Traveler) – played by Brent Stait, science officer (seasons 1–2; guest seasons 3–4).
 Andromeda (Rommie) – played by Lexa Doig, ship's artificial intelligence and android avatar.
 Telemachus Rhade – played by Steve Bacic, weapons officer (seasons 4–5).
 Doyle – played by Brandy Ledford, AI's second android avatar (season 5).

Andromeda universe

Slipstream
Slipstream is the primary mode of travel for ships in the Andromeda universe, and the only known method of traveling faster than the speed of light. The Vedran discovery of the slipstream was instrumental in the formation of their interstellar empire, which became the precursor of the Systems Commonwealth.

Slipstream cannot be navigated by AIs (they have a 50% chance of choosing the correct path). Only organic pilots can "sense" a way to their destination (they have a 99% chance of choosing the correct path), and although AIs are fitted on all large ships, they always require an organic pilot for interstellar travel. It is thought to be the process of choosing a path that makes the chosen path the correct one.

A function of slipstream is that apparent objective velocities are extremely variable, as it enables travel across millions of light years seemingly as swiftly as traveling between neighboring stars only tens of light years apart. Further, slipstream is a non-linear method of travel; the best and swiftest way to get from Point A to Point B (though they might be in the same galaxy) may very well involve hopping to another galaxy entirely. Also, the more frequently used routes are often easier, faster and more predictable.

Systems Commonwealth
The Systems Commonwealth was a huge utopian civilization, spanning three major galaxies of the Local Group. It was founded by the Vedrans, the first race to discover slipstream, who initially used it to conquer the Andromeda Galaxy. After a long and bitter war of attrition with the major powers of the Triangulum Galaxy, the Vedran Empire was reorganized as the democratic Systems Commonwealth. The Commonwealth served as a peaceful intergalactic government for almost 10,000 years until the Nietzschean revolt.

Major star systems
 Hephaestus, a system with a significant Nietzschean population that was devastated by a rogue black hole in the pilot episode and the place of Dylan's frozen imprisonment in time for 300 years. 
 Mobius, a barren world with underground cities. Mobius was ruled by ruthless dictators for many centuries but joined the New Commonwealth when its leader, the "Great Compass" Venetri, resigned.
 San-Ska-Re, a Than homeworld and a major power in post-Fall Known Worlds. Did not actually appear on screen.
 Seefra, a mysterious artificial system of nine planets and two suns where Dylan and his crew were transported after the Battle of Arkology. 
 Tarazed, a world with significant human and loyalist Nietzschean populations; it survived the Long Night largely unscathed. It became the first capital of the New Commonwealth. Birthplace of Telemachus Rhade. Tarazed was described in the series as being located in another galaxy and therefore is not intended to be equivalent to a non-fictional star of the same name.
 Tarn-Vedra, the capital of the Old Systems Commonwealth and Vedran homeworld. All slipstream routes to Tarn-Vedra vanished soon after the Nietzschean rebellion, contributing to the ensuing chaos. Dylan was born on Tarn-Vedra. One of his motivations for restoring the Commonwealth is the search for his own lost home.
 Earth was ravaged by the Nietzschean occupation and Magog assaults during the Long Night. Harper was born and acquired his notable survival skills there.
 Arkology, a huge space station with a pacifist population.

Major races
 Avatars of the Suns, humanoid forms of stars with great powers. They are immortal and can travel through time and space, affecting events and people as they wish.
 Humans make up about 70% of the Known Worlds population. Subspecies with minor genetic enhancements (like the Inari) are common.
 Kalderans, a xenophobic reptilian race that once rivaled the Vedrans. 
 Magog, a race of savage semi-intelligent alien killers, feared throughout the Known Worlds. The Magog have to kill and eat fresh meat to sustain themselves and to lay eggs in sentient beings to procreate.
 Nietzscheans, a group of superior humans who believed in self-improvement via genetic engineering and intense competition. They left the planet Earth thousands of years ago and evolved into a separate subspecies (Homo sapiens invictus) that colonized many worlds throughout the galaxies. Nietzscheans are responsible for the Fall of the Systems Commonwealth; however, they failed to replace it with the Nietzschean Empire (as they had originally planned) because of constant betrayals and conflicts between different Nietzschean Prides.
 Nightsiders, rat-like humanoids with poor vision, but highly developed hearing. Their reproductive cycle is very damaging to the environment, as their early larval stage is an aquatic creature that eats anything it comes across.
 Paradine, a highly evolved form of the Vedrans, who look like ordinary humans. The Paradine apparently had a special role in dealing with the Avatars of the Suns and the Route of Ages, but they are all but extinct now. 
 Perseids, a highly intelligent race of alien scientists and bureaucrats.
 Pyrian, a grotesque, tentacled orb like species who are one of the most powerful enemies of the Commonwealth.
 Than-Thre-Kull (Than), a tough and highly intelligent and civilized insectoid race divided into various function-specific castes.
 Vedrans, the first intelligent race to discover the slipstream that connects the entire universe. The Vedrans went on to conquer the Known Worlds, building the Vedran Empire. The Empire was plagued by internal conflicts and eventually was peacefully transformed into the Systems Commonwealth.

Other races
 Bokor, dangerous parasites that possess other species in order to survive, spreading through physical contact. Inside their shells, the Bokor are practically invulnerable to any type of weapon, ranging to energy, melee or bullets. However, they are vulnerable to electricity. Their existence in the Known Worlds is abhorred by the Than, who attack any vessel carrying them. For normal humanoids, it takes a while for the Bokor to destroy their neural functions and take over.
 Ogami, a race of brutish pirates and mercenaries.

Organizations
 Collectors, The Commonwealth's keepers of secret history. 
 Genites, a high-tech, numerous and well-organized intergalactic group whose aim is to rid the universe of genetically engineered beings, especially the Nietzschean Prides, who brought about the downfall of humanity.
 High Guard, the main military force of the Systems Commonwealth.
 Tech Police, the brutish anti-tech enforcement on Seefra-1.
 Templar, a group of men and women who sought to restore order after the Fall. They were founded by High Guard Admiral Constanza Stark.

Production
Majel Barrett and Tribune Entertainment began developing series from Gene Roddenberry's archive in 1997. Robert Hewitt Wolfe was brought in to develop the series. Fireworks Entertainment was brought in to co-finance and for international distribution. In early 1999, actor Kevin Sorbo was recruited to star in the series while he starred in Hercules: The Legendary Journeys. Eric Gold, and Barrett were also to be executive producers and Wolfe as co-executive producer. Bette Chadwick was in charge of casting, while visual effects were initially handled by Lost Boys Studios and Northwest Imaging & FX. By September 9, 1999, Tribune had stations committed for two years in 24 of the top 30 markets with 22 Tribune and 38 Sinclair stations for a 60% national clearance giving the series a green light. The show was offered barter terms with an eight national/six local advertising split.

The Andromeda theme music that was used in the first season was composed by Alex Lifeson, guitarist for the Canadian progressive rock band Rush; executive producer Robert Hewitt Wolfe is a big fan.

Andromedas first episode was aired on syndication in the United States on October 2, 2000 while being carried on Global Television Network in Canada. Tribune Broadcasting station signed on to carry the show in its first season. On January 20, 2002, Andromeda was renewed for two seasons, its third and fourth, having gotten two year deals with stations in 39 out the top 40 markets. By January 31, 2003, the show was renewed for its fourth season, 2003–2004, in 148 markets representing 88% of the United States. The show was averaging 2.2 rating for the 2002–2003 season, third behind Stargate SG-1. For the 2003–2004 season, the show is one of only four first-run scripted series in syndication along with its Tribune stable mate, Mutant X.

On January 14, 2004, the Sci-Fi Channel made a deal for the show and all its episodes plus fellow Tribune syndicated but discontinued show Beastmaster. In March, the cable channel would start showing season four episodes which would then be seen in syndication seven to ten days later. With the deal, the series was renewed for its fifth and final season. The show began its run on Sci-Fi with a re-airing of the two-hour pilot episode.

On April 23, 2004, CanWest Global Communications announced the closure of Fireworks Entertainment and placing Fireworks' library up for sale. With Fireworks being the primary production company, this was effectively the show's cancellation notice. However two of Fireworks shows were shifted to fellow CanWest subsidiary Global Television, and the fact the show was renewed just in January. Tribune had ordered the show and Mutant X into production for the 2004–2005 season under the show's contract options. Fireworks Entertainment took Tribune to court to get an order releasing them from production and financing the two series.

Robert Hewitt Wolfe's departure
Controversy erupted in the midst of the second season, when series developer and executive producer Robert Hewitt Wolfe announced he had been released from the show's production, although his influence was felt until the completion of the second season; at that point, Bob Engels was brought on to be an executive producer of the series. The reason for the change was purportedly to make the show more episodic and open to casual viewing since Wolfe's version—although episodic—had many continuing plotlines and story arcs. After the show's final episode aired, Wolfe wrote and published a one-act play entitled "Coda" that explained his intended plans for the show without contradicting the already aired episodes. This play is now hosted on Drive Back the Night – An Andromeda Podcast.

In discussion on his website's forums and various interviews, Wolfe has elaborated that he was released from the production staff after he refused to shift the show's focus more heavily onto Kevin Sorbo's character, Dylan Hunt, by essentially making all of the show's episodes as Hunt-centric. The events of the episode "Ouroboros", the final episode written by Wolfe, introduced the last major changes that Wolfe was willing to make to the series.

Home media

By 2003, ADV Films had home video/DVD rights for the show. The company released the entire series on DVD in region 1 between 2003 and 2006. In December 2003, ADV released Season 3, Collection 2. On October 3, 2006, they released a complete series DVD box set known as Andromeda: The Slipstream Collection.

Alliance Home Entertainment has released all five seasons on DVD in Canada only.

In Region 2, Revelation Films has released the first four seasons on DVD in the United Kingdom. The fifth and final season was released on November 24, 2014.

On January 26, 2015, Revelation Films released a complete series set on DVD in the United Kingdom.

In Region 4, Beyond Home Entertainment has released all five seasons on DVD in Australia. In 2007/2008, they re-released all five seasons in new collector's editions that featured new packaging and all episodes were digitally re-mastered in widescreen format.

A region B Blu-ray release of the first season was released on June 24, 2013, in the United Kingdom, with the next two seasons following by the end of that year.

The all-region Blu-ray release of the complete box set of all five seasons was released on September 19, 2016.

Reception 
The first season received mixed to negative reviews, with perhaps the most positive take coming from Starburst ("delightfully motley cast of characters, and the scripts by Wolfe and his writing team are brimming with witty interplay). Lukewarm positive reviews came from Variety ("it could offer a few campy laughs on a weekend afternoon") and Digital Spy ("this show hasn't exactly aged that well... but if you remotely like sci-fi, we also bet you'll find yourself sucked into this nostalgia-fest in no time").

It received middling or negative from the Los Angeles Times ("Don’t expect much excitement... 'Andromeda' isn’t intended to be taken too seriously, but that doesn’t excuse its penchant for dopey dialogue"), Entertainment Weekly ("After surviving a hilariously bad slow motion fight sequence.. Sorbo meets up with a band of misfit scavengers who may not be as bad as they seem, but make up for it by being twice as annoying"), Common Sense Media ("this series lacks the spark that made Star Trek so much fun. The politics sometimes seem overly confusing, and some of the characters are thinly developed"), SciFiNow ("It's a cliche but decent enough... but the problem is that Andromeda falls into Star Trek: Voyager territory by playing it safe and not doing enough to develop its characters") and Pittsburgh Post-Gazette ("it's kiddie-minded science-fiction with average special effects... and a set that was clearly built on a lower budget than the 'Star Trek' shows.").

Awards
Andromeda was nominated for 39 awards at organizational events spanning the years 2001 to 2006. The nominations comprised six Academy of Science Fiction, Fantasy & Horror Films, USA awards, five Chicago International Film Festival awards, eight Gemini Awards, fifteen Leo Awards, and five WorldFest-Houston International Film Festival awards. The show won 18 of those awards.

References

External links

 
 
  Includes detailed episode guide.

 
2000s American science fiction television series
2000s Canadian science fiction television series
2000 American television series debuts
2000 Canadian television series debuts
2005 American television series endings
2005 Canadian television series endings
American adventure television series
American action television series
Canadian adventure television series
Canadian action television series
Androids in television
Space opera television series
First-run syndicated television programs in the United States
Syfy original programming
Television series about extraterrestrial life
Television series set in the future
Television series by Tribune Entertainment
Television series by Corus Entertainment
Space adventure television series
Works by Ashley Miller and Zack Stentz
Military science fiction television series
Fiction about intergalactic travel
Television shows based on works by Gene Roddenberry
Television series set in the 6th millennium
Television shows filmed in Vancouver